St. Charles was a small, screw-driven steamboat that serviced the upper Peace River, from 1903 to 1914.
She was built from local timber for Brothers of the Oblate Order of Mary Immaculate, using engines and other fittings brought from Peterborough, Ontario.

She was the first steamboat on the upper Peace River.
She was sold in 1911 to Ford and Lawrence.
According to Edward L. Affleck, St. Charles was one of a "fleet of pint-sized vessels" the Order operated, so they would not have to rely on the Hudson's Bay Company's monopoly on river shipping.

St Charles was confined to the upper reaches.

See also
 Western Canadian steamships of the Oblate Order of Mary Immaculate

References

1903 ships
Steamships of Canada
Water transport in the Northwest Territories